Trichodorcadion gardneri is a species of beetle in the family Cerambycidae. It was described by Stephan von Breuning in 1942. It is known from Nepal and India.

References

Dorcadiini
Beetles described in 1942